The cycling competition at the 2001 Mediterranean Games was a men-only competition. Track events were absent from the programme and the only two events were an individual time trial and an individual road race.

Men's competition

Individual time trial
Over 39.3 kilometres

Individual road race
Over 150 kilometres

Medal table

References
Complete 2001 Mediterranean Games Standings

Mediterranean Games
Sports at the 2001 Mediterranean Games
2001
2001 in road cycling